Psidium sintenisii is a species of flowering plant in the myrtle family, Myrtaceae. It is endemic to Puerto Rico, where it is known from three or four small subpopulations, mainly within El Yunque National Forest. It grows in wet mountain forest habitat. Its common names are Sintenis' guava and hoja menuda.

This evergreen tree, a species of wild guava, can reach  in height. It has gray, grooved, shreddy bark on the trunk and greenish branches. Flowers are solitary in the leaf axils, borne on long stalks. The buds are shaped like tops, and they are fragrant.

References

sintenisii
Trees of Puerto Rico
Endemic flora of Puerto Rico
Critically endangered plants
Taxonomy articles created by Polbot